Sir Alexander Kaye Butterworth (1854–1946) was the General Manager of the North Eastern Railway and also chairman of the Railway Executive during the First World War. He was the father of the composer George Butterworth (1885–1916)

Personal life
Butterworth was born on 4 December 1854 at Clifton, Bristol, Gloucestershire, the son of the Reverend George Butterworth of Deerhurst, Gloucestershire, and his wife Frances Maria Butterworth (née Kaye). Butterworth was a great grandson of the abolitionist Joseph Butterworth. He was educated at Marlborough College from August 1868 to March 1874, and then attended London University, where he graduated in 1877.

Butterworth married Julia Marguerite Wigan at St Margaret's, Westminster on 16 July 1884. Their son George became a composer. He was killed in action during the Battle of the Somme in 1916. Julia died in 1911. Butterworth was knighted in 1914. He married Dorothea Mavor in 1916.

Sports

Butterworth played rackets and rugby at school, as well as performing gymnastics. In 1874, he joined Clifton Rugby Football Club. He played tennis at Wimbledon in 1880, losing in the first round to R. T. Richardson 3-0.

Career
Butterworth qualified for The Bar in 1878, and qualified as a solicitor in 1883. He gained his Bachelor of Law degree in 1884, He then joined the Great Western Railway, working in its legal department. During 1889 and 1890, Butterworth played a leading role in the Railway Rates Inquiry, acting for the English, Irish and Scottish railway companies. In 1890, he was appointed a Clerk of the Peace for Bedfordshire, a position he held for six months, before joining the North Eastern Railway (NER) as a solicitor in February 1891. In 1905, he succeeded Sir George Gibb as General Manager. He represented the NER in his capacity a company solicitor at the inquiry into the railway accident at Thirsk in 1892.

During the First World War, Butterworth was appointed chairman of the Railway Executive Committee in addition to his position with the NER, a position he held until 1919. He was also chairman of the Victoria Park Hospital for Heart and Chest Diseases from 1916–35. He was succeeded in that position by Henry Guest. Butterworth served on the Civil Service Arbitration Board from 1917–20. He retired from his position as General Manager of the NER on 31 December 1921 and was succeeded by Ralph Wedgwood. Butterworth remained in the employ of the NER until it ceased to exist at the Grouping of the Railways in 1923.

Death
Butterworth died on 23 January 1946 at his home in Hampstead, Middlesex following a short illness. His funeral was held on 28 January at St John-at-Hampstead Church and he was interred in the churchyard.

References

1854 births
1946 deaths
Bristol Bears players
British male tennis players
British solicitors
English male tennis players
English rugby union players
Great Western Railway people
North Eastern Railway (UK) people
People educated at Marlborough College
Rugby union players from Clifton, Bristol
Tennis people from Bristol